Strathmore (Appleton Field) Aerodrome  is located  west south southeast of Strathmore, Alberta, Canada.

See also
Strathmore (D.J. Murray) Airport

References

External links
Place to Fly on COPA's Places to Fly airport directory

Registered aerodromes in Alberta
Wheatland County, Alberta